Otto Albin Frostman (3 January 1907 – 29 December 1977) was a Swedish mathematician, known for his work in potential theory and complex analysis.

Frostman earned his Ph.D. in 1935 at Lund University under the Hungarian-born mathematician Marcel Riesz, the younger brother of Frigyes Riesz. In potential theory, Frostman's lemma is named after him. He supervised the 1971 Stockholm University Ph.D. thesis of Bernt Lindström, which initiated the "Stockholm School" of topological combinatorics (combining simplicial homology and enumerative combinatorics).

Notes

External links
 
 ICMI webpage

Mathematical analysts
Directors of the Mittag-Leffler Institute
1977 deaths
1907 births
20th-century Swedish mathematicians
Members of the Royal Swedish Academy of Sciences